C.S.H.L (Centre for the Study of Human Learning) was established as a Post-Graduate Research Centre. Originally this was within the newly created Psychology Department of Brunel University (1962). Within C.S.H.L. both research staff and post graduate students are enabled to progressively investigate the nature of human learning. It has gradually become evident that once the shackles of most forms of existing education are loosened, people {from primary school to post graduate work; and most other forms of instruction} can explore how each and every one of them can be enabled to learn how to thoroughly understand in personal terms much of what they need to know when and how they need to know it. And to do this in clearer and more applicable terms than their education seems to have allowed them to achieve. Whilst doing this, Sheila Harri-Augstein and Laurie Thomas invented, and indeed created, {and during the period 1962 up until the present day have gradually continued to improve both the concept and the practical reality of Self-Organised-Learning (S-O-L)}.

C.S.H.L's Purpose 

The Centre's original goal was to enable students to learn better and more efficiently. This was started as the senate of Brunel asked Prof. Laurie Thomas to looking into how students 'learn-to-learn'. After some research into this and various other results, professor Thomas formed C.S.H.L (while inside the Psychology Department at the time) to further research into newer methods after noting the results of the initial research and deciding this needed more exploration.

Self-Organised Learning (S-O-L)

Psychological Research Methods

Historical Footnotes 

 (1965) Founded inside the Psychology Department of Brunel College of Advanced Technology (Now Brunel University after 1966).
 (1967) Left Psychology Department to become its own unit.
 (2000) C.S.H.L leaves Brunel University to become its own independent Non-Profit Organisation.

Why C.S.H.L was established 
Whilst Professor Laurie F. Thomas was still the Senior Lecturer in the Production Engineering department at Brunel College of Advanced Technology, the Senate asked him to chair a group which would advise on the idea of Learning-to-Learn together with Senior Lecturers from each of the mainstream departments.  They interviewed various people and discussed and argued at length.  Eventually it was decided that the committee should submit a report to the Senate.

However, it had sown a seed into Professor Thomas' mind which after a year visit to the U.S. (1962–63) in looking at new research in 'Learning' and time spent with Professor Carl Rodgers, Prof. Thomas then returned to Brunel and saw the launching of the Psychology department into Brunel which by then had now become a university.

Six years later, with a variety of research projects underway, university politics made it necessary to create 'The Centre for the Study of Human Learning' to keep this research going.

Academic interest in CSHL and S-O-L 
Warwick University has a Personal Development course which has Self-Organised Learning together with C.S.H.L. as a Resource for helping with the course and personal development.

References

External links 
 Center for the Study of Human Learning's Homepage: CSHL Homepage
 CSHL Thesis's Page at Brunel University Archives:  Bura CSHL Section

Brunel University London